The  is the world's first liquid hydrogen carrier ship.

Design and construction 
The Suiso Frontier was built by Kawasaki Heavy Industries, following support by the governments of Japan and Australia. The ship carries liquid hydrogen, the first load of which was extracted from brown coal in Australia and carried to Kobe, Japan. As a prototype, she is planned to lead to a commercial liquid hydrogen sometime in the mid-2020s.

Although the first in service, a liquid hydrogen carrier ship is not a unique design. Korea Shipbuilding & Offshore Engineering of South Korea and the Wilhelmsen Group of Norway both have designs for a ship of the same type, the latter being a roll-on/roll-off vessel. A joint design by Canada's Ballard Power Systems and Australia's Global Energy Ventures is currently developing a ship where hydrogen is transported in a compressed gas form.

Kawasaki Heavy Industries is a member of HySTRA and, along with Iwatani, Shell, and Electric Power Development, plans to promote hydrogen as a fuel source.

The ship carries a double shielded and double insulated 1,250 cubic-meter tank to both hold and maintain hydrogen at a temperature of -253 degrees Celsius. She is 116 meters long, displaced 8,000 gross tons, molded breadth of 62 feet, molded depth of 35 feet and a molded draft of 15 feet. Its diesel-electric propulsion provides a top speed of 13 knots maintained by a crew of 25.

The hydrogen's production plan quickly drew criticism for its management of the carbon dioxide that will be created as a byproduct.

Service history 
On December 24, 2021, she left Japan for a two week trip to  Port of Hastings, Australia, which is expected to return to Japan in mid February 2022 with her first cargo. Her trip was extended to 16 days as the vessel avoided bad weather  and rough seas.

Gallery

References 

Ships built by Kawasaki Heavy Industries
Hydrogen tankers